Naundorf may refer to:

Geography
Naundorf, Saxony, in the Torgau-Oschatz district, Saxony
Naundorf, Thuringia, in the Altenburger Land district, Thuringia
Naundorf bei Seyda, in the Wittenberg district, Saxony-Anhalt
Groß Naundorf, in the Wittenberg district, Saxony-Anhalt
Naundorf (Radebeul), part of Radebeul, Saxony
Naundorf (Brandenburg), a part of Fichtwald in the Elbe-Elster district, Brandenburg
Naundorf (Bobritzsch), a part of Bobritzsch (municipality) in the Freiberg district, Saxony
Naundorf (Striegis), a part of Tiefenbach, Saxony
Naundorf (Oberlausitz), a part of Doberschau-Gaußig, Saxony
Naundorf bei Dippoldiswalde, a part of Schmiedeberg, Saxony 
Naundorf bei Ruhland, part of Schwarzheide, Brandenburg
Naundorf (Struppen), part of Struppen, Saxony

People with the surname
Karl Wilhelm Naundorff, German clockmaker who claimed to be Louis XVII of France